Barclay Knapp is a Senior Fellow in the Center for Financial Economics at The Johns Hopkins University, and has formed Charles Street Partners, to pursue financing and management opportunities in the telecommunications industry. He co-founded Cellular Communications Inc. (CCI), serving as CFO and later as President and COO.

Knapp later co-founded International CableTel, later known as NTL Incorporated and which ultimately became one of the two businessesthat merged to form Virgin Media, along with Telewest. Knapp built up NTL's share price to a high of 21 billion pounds in 2000 and then presided over a financial restructuring that, while it almost wiped out the company's shareholders, preserved the business and ensured creditors and other stakeholders participated in the restructured business that emerged after the deep worldwide recession that followed the bursting of the “telecom bubble” that prompted the restructuring. NTL was one of the largest restructurings of that time (early 2000s) that did not involve any significant scandals or wrongdoing, at the same time that Enron, Adelphia, Worldcom and others exposed massive fraud.

References

Johns Hopkins University alumni
Living people
Year of birth missing (living people)
Johns Hopkins University fellows
People from Bellevue, Nebraska
People from Sarpy County, Nebraska